Gilbert Marc Dionne (born September 19, 1970) is a Canadian former professional ice hockey left winger who played six seasons in the National Hockey League from 1990–91 until 1995–96. He is the younger brother of Hockey Hall of Famer Marcel Dionne, who is nineteen years his senior. He now resides in Tavistock, Ontario.

Biography
As a youth, Dionne played in the 1982 and 1983 Quebec International Pee-Wee Hockey Tournaments with a minor ice hockey team from Drummondville.

Dionne was drafted 81st overall by the Montreal Canadiens in the 1990 NHL Entry Draft after a productive career in juniors.

Following a solid first season with the Montreal affiliate Fredericton in 1990-91, he was brought up to the Canadiens for two regular season games.

He returned to Fredericton for the start of 1991-92 and scored 46pts in 29 games prompting Montreal to being Dionne back to the parent team part way through the 1991–92 NHL season. After scoring 21 goals and 34 points in  only 39 games, and another 7 points in 11 playoff games he would end up being named in the NHL All-Rookie Team.

He played a few games with Fredericton the following 1992-93 season, scoring 7 points in 3 games, but was soon called up and appeared in 75 games for Montreal, scoring 48 points. More significantly, he was a valuable contributor in the playoffs with 12 points in 20 games as the Canadiens won the Stanley Cup.

The following 93-94 season, he stayed with Montreal, but after a bright start, his scoring trailed off and he found himself a healthy scratch in several games, and two in the playoffs.

The following season started quietly, and Dionne struggled to make the ice on a regular basis. With the Canadiens struggling to keep pace for a playoff slot, they entered into a trade with the Philadelphia Flyers. The deal saw Mark Recchi join Montreal along with a draft pick, while the Flyers gained defenseman Eric Desjardins, and power forward John Leclair along with Dionne.

His Flyers career saw him suit up 20 times in the first season and manage 6 assists, but he soon lost his regular position and found himself fighting to stay on the lower order lines. After being waived the following season, he played for a short while for the Florida Panthers affiliate the Carolina Monarchs where he was again prolific, but found opportunities back in the NHL lacking.

Overall, he played 223 career NHL games, scoring 61 goals and 79 assists for 140 points.

Sent down to the minor leagues thereafter, he remained a minor league star, playing seven more seasons in the American Hockey League and International Hockey League before closing out his professional career with two seasons in Germany.

His jersey number (21) was retired by the Cincinnati Cyclones of the ECHL on December 2, 2006, in recognition of "Gilbert Dionne Day". He played four seasons for the Cyclones, then in the International Hockey League, leading the team in scoring twice and being the franchise's second leading career scorer behind Don Biggs.

Career statistics

References

External links
 

1970 births
Canadian ice hockey left wingers
Florida Panthers players
Fredericton Canadiens players
French Quebecers
Ice hockey people from Quebec
Kitchener Rangers players
Living people
Montreal Canadiens draft picks
Montreal Canadiens players
Sportspeople from Drummondville
Philadelphia Flyers players
Stanley Cup champions